Clipping is the cutting-out of articles from a paper publication. Newspaper clippings are often used when people have to write a report or make a presentation on current events for school.  Clippings may also be kept by adults for future reference, or for sentimental reasons such as an article on a history-making event. One service of Media monitoring services, which monitor the media exposure of a client, is to collect clippings referring to a client.

Collage
Clipping can also be used for artistic purposes as in collage. Picasso's "Glass and Bottle of Suze" is an example of this technique.

See also

 Media monitoring service
 Collage

References

Collage
Newspapers